Hall Rock is a large rock located  northwest of Carapace Nunatak at the edge of the polar plateau of Victoria Land, Antarctica. It was named by the Advisory Committee on Antarctic Names for geologist Bradford A. Hall who, with Harold W. Borns, did research on the so-called Mawson Tillite in this vicinity, 1968–69.

References

Rock formations of Oates Land